Martin James Guptill (born 30 September 1986) is a New Zealand international cricketer who plays as an opening batsman in limited overs formats of the game. Guptill is the first cricketer from New Zealand and the fifth overall to have scored a double century in a One Day International match and holds the current record for the highest individual score in Cricket World Cup matches and the second highest score in One Day Internationals of 237 not out. In March 2021, Guptill played in his 100th T20I match.

Guptill has scored more than 600 T20I runs in the Eden Park cricket stadium. He is the first and the only player to score 500 and 600 plus T20I runs at a single venue.

Personal life
Guptill was born in Auckland in 1986. He attended Kelston Primary and Kelston Boys' High School before transferring to Avondale College where he played cricket and was prefect. His wife is journalist and reporter Laura McGoldrick, whilst his cousin, Michael Guptill-Bunce, has also played cricket for Auckland.

Guptill has only two toes on his left foot. At the age of 13, he was involved in a forklift accident and lost three toes. He is nicknamed "Two Toes" within the New Zealand cricket squad. He studied at Kelston Boys High School for 4 years and on his final year of secondary school he switched to Avondale College.

Domestic and T20 cricket
In domestic cricket, Guptill plays for Auckland, and for Suburbs New Lynn in club cricket. He made his first-class cricket debut in March 2006, scoring a four-ball duck in his first innings, and 99 in his second. In 2011 Guptill played in English county cricket during the second half of the season for Derbyshire County Cricket Club.

Guptill played for Mumbai Indians in the 2016 Indian Premier League as a replacement for the injured Lendl Simmons and for Kings XI Punjab in the 2017 Indian Premier League. In December 2018, he was bought by the Sunrisers Hyderabad in the player auction for the 2019 Indian Premier League.

In July 2019, he was selected to play for the Edinburgh Rocks in the inaugural edition of the Euro T20 Slam cricket tournament. However, the following month the tournament was cancelled. He was released by the Sunrisers Hyderabad ahead of the 2020 IPL auction.

In April 2021, he was signed by Karachi Kings to play in the rescheduled matches in the 2021 Pakistan Super League. In July 2022, he was signed by Kandy Falcons in 2022 Lanka Premier League

International cricket
Guptill first represented New Zealand in the Under-19 Cricket World Cup held in Sri Lanka in 2006. He made his One Day International (ODI) debut for New Zealand on 10 January 2009 against the West Indies in Auckland, becoming the first New Zealander to score a century on his one-day debut – his score of 122 not out is the highest score on debut for New Zealand in an ODI, and second highest debut score ever in ODIs and he was the first New Zealander to carry the bat through a completed ODI innings. He made his Test cricket debut against India in the first Test at Hamilton in March 2009, scoring 14 and 48. For his performances in 2009, he was named in the World ODI XI by the ICC.

For his performances in the 2011–12 season, he won the Sir Richard Hadlee Medal. He was awarded the T20 Player of the Year by NZC for the 2011–12 season.

In the New Zealand 2013 tour of England, Guptill scored back-to-back undefeated hundreds at Lord's and Southampton, scoring 189 not out, at the time the highest score by a New Zealander in an ODI, and contributed to the then fifth-highest team total in ODI history (359).

Guptill surpassed his best score in the 2015 World Cup, scoring an unbeaten 237 from 163 balls against West Indies in the quarter-finals at the Westpac Stadium in Wellington. He was the first player to score a double century in a knockout stage match as New Zealand scored 393, the best total in a World Cup knockout match. After scoring three ducks in group matches he ended the tournament with 547 runs, emerging as the highest scorer.

In May 2018, he was one of twenty players to be awarded a new contract for the 2018–19 season by New Zealand Cricket. In April 2019, he was named in New Zealand's squad for the 2019 Cricket World Cup. In August 2021, Guptill was named in New Zealand's squad for the 2021 ICC Men's T20 World Cup. On 3 November 2021, in New Zealand's T20 World Cup match against Scotland, Guptill became the second batsman to score 3,000 runs in T20I cricket. Guptill has been released from his national contract after being omitted from the squad for the India T20 series, heralding the end of the veteran batsman's international career. As of 18 December 2022, Guptill has scored 7346 runs in One Day International cricket.

Records

 Guptill scored back to back unbeaten ODI centuries against England in 2013. He scored 330 runs in the three-match ODI series, a world record for most runs in a three-match bilateral ODI series at the time.
 He was the first New Zealander and the fifth player overall to score a double century in an ODI. His 237 not out remains the highest individual score in World Cup cricket and the second highest score in ODIs.
 Guptill has the record for the highest individual score as an opener who remained unbeaten throughout the innings of an ODI (237*)
 He was the first man to face a pink ball in a day-night Test match at Adelaide in November 2015. He was the first man to be dismissed in a day-night Test.
 Guptill scored the fastest ODI fifty by a New Zealander – his 17-ball fifty is the joint second fastest fifty of all time.
 Guptill has three ODI scores over 180, the most by any New Zealand cricketer
 In January 2018, Guptill became the second New Zealand player and ninth overall to score a century against each of the other nine full member Test-playing nations.
 , Guptill has scored the second most runs in T20I cricket. He was the highest scorer until his record was broken by Rohit Sharma.
As of April 2021, Guptill has scored 600 plus T20I runs in the Eden Park cricket stadium. He is the first and the only cricketer to score 500 and 600 plus T20I runs in a single venue.
 , Guptill has scored 3497 runs which is the third most runs in T20I cricket.

Career best performances
, Guptill has scored three Test, 16 ODI and two Twenty20 International centuries. In total he has made 14 first-class, 24 List A and four Twenty20 centuries . Two of his centuries have been double-centuries.

Guptill's first international century was made in his New Zealand debut in an ODI against the West Indies at Auckland in 2009. Guptil's innings of 122 not out was described as "one of the best I've seen in a long time" by the New Zealand captain Daniel Vettori. His century was the first by a New Zealander on their ODI debut. He went on to make the highest ODI score by a New Zealander at Southampton in June 2013, scoring 189 not out against England. At the time the score was the fifth highest in any ODI and equalled the highest individual score made against England.

Guptil went on to set a new ODI record for New Zealand when he made the highest score of his career, 237 not out in the 2015 World Cup against West Indies at Wellington. The innings was the second highest scoring individual innings in ODI history and remains Guptill's highest score in any form of cricket. His other double-century was made playing for Derbyshire in a 2015 County Championship match at Bristol. This is his only first-class double century .

See also
 List of One Day International cricket double centuries

References

External links

 

1986 births
Auckland cricketers
Barbados Royals cricketers
Cricketers at the 2011 Cricket World Cup
Cricketers at the 2015 Cricket World Cup
Cricketers at the 2019 Cricket World Cup
Cricketers from Auckland
Cricketers who made a century on One Day International debut
Derbyshire cricketers
Guyana Amazon Warriors cricketers
Karachi Kings cricketers
Lancashire cricketers
Living people
Melbourne Renegades cricketers
Mumbai Indians cricketers
New Zealand cricketers
New Zealand One Day International cricketers
New Zealand Test cricketers
New Zealand Twenty20 International cricketers
North Island cricketers
People educated at Avondale College
Punjab Kings cricketers
Sportspeople with limb difference
St Kitts and Nevis Patriots cricketers
Sunrisers Hyderabad cricketers
Sydney Thunder cricketers
Worcestershire cricketers